The Hundred Acre Wood (also spelled as 100 Aker Wood, Hundred-Acre Wood, and 100 Acre Wood; also known as simply "The Wood") is a part of the fictional land inhabited by Winnie-the-Pooh and his friends in the Winnie-the-Pooh series of children's stories by author A. A. Milne. The wood is visited regularly by the young boy Christopher Robin, who accompanies Pooh and company on their many adventures.

In A. A. Milne's books, the term "Hundred Acre Wood" is actually used for a specific part of the larger Forest, centred on Owl's house (see the map in the book, as well as numerous references in the text to the characters going "into" or "out of" the Hundred Acre Wood as they go between Owl's house and other Forest locations). However, in the Pooh movies, and in general conversation with most Pooh fans, "The Hundred Acre Wood" is used for the entire world of Winnie-the-Pooh, the Forest and all the places it contains.

The Hundred Acre Wood of the Winnie-the-Pooh stories was inspired by Five Hundred Acre Wood in Ashdown Forest in East Sussex, England. A. A. Milne's country home at Cotchford Farm, Hartfield was situated just north of Ashdown Forest, and Five Hundred Acre Wood is a dense beech wood that Christopher Robin Milne would explore on his way from Cotchford Farm onto the Forest. Five Hundred Acre Wood is long-established, having been originally sold off from the Forest in 1678. The wood remains privately owned, being part of Buckhurst Park estate, and is not therefore generally accessible to the public, though two footpaths which are public rights of way, one of which is part of a long-distance footpath, the Wealdway, cross through the wood and may be used by members of the public.

Milne was inspired by the landscape of Ashdown Forest to use it as the setting for his Winnie-the-Pooh stories, and many features from the stories can be identified with specific locations in the forest. The car park at the hilltop of Gills Lap (the Galleon's Lap of the Pooh stories) in Ashdown Forest,, contains a display panel with a map of the surrounding area and the features from several of the Winnie-the-Pooh stories marked on it. For example, Five Hundred Acre Wood lies a short distance to the north-east, while the "Enchanted Place" is a small wooded area  to the north. Five Hundred Acre Wood lies a short distance to the north-east.

Places in the Wood
The following places are shown on Ernest H. Shepard's map at the beginning of the Winnie-the-Pooh book:

 Pooh Bear's House
 Kanga's House
 The Sandy Pit Where Roo Plays
 A Nice Place for Picnics
 The Bee Tree
 The way to the North Pole
 An area with Big Stones and Rocks
 Rabbit's House
 An area for Rabbit's Friends-and-Relations
 Christopher Robin's House
 The Six Pine Trees
 The Pooh Trap for Heffalumps
 Piglet's House
 Where the Woozle Wasn't
 A Floody Place
 Owl's House
 Eeyore's Gloomy Place

Additional places mentioned in the books, but not shown on the map include:

 The House at Pooh Corner
 The Poohsticks Bridge
 The Stepping Stones
 A Gravel Pit
 Pooh's Thoughtful Spot
 Galleon's Lap
 Tigger’s house (Disney materials only)

Residents of the Wood
Eeyore
Kanga
Lottie
Owl
Piglet
Rabbit
Christopher Robin
Roo
Tigger
Winnie-the-Pooh
Heffalumps

Disney materials only
Beaver
Buster
Darby
Gopher
Stan
Heff
Wooster
Kessie
Lumpy
Porcupine
Raccoon
Skunk
Squirrels
Turtle
Woodpecker

In other media
In the Kingdom Hearts series, the Hundred Acre Wood is located within a book found at Merlin's house (which is in Traverse Town during Kingdom Hearts, Hollow Bastion in Kingdom Hearts II, and Twilight Town in Kingdom Hearts III). In the games, the main character, Sora, gathers pages of a Winnie-the-Pooh storybook after it is destroyed, affecting the inhabitants. The Hundred Acre Wood is unique in being a totally optional world to visit and entirely lacking in combat, rather being made up of several minigames which reward the player with experience and items.

References

Winnie-the-Pooh
Fictional locations of Disney
Fictional places in Disney films
Fictional elements introduced in 1924
East Sussex in fiction
Fictional forests
Fictional locations in the United Kingdom
Ashdown Forest